Shane Charles (born 30 August 1983) is a Grenadian retired athlete who specialized in the 400 metres hurdles. In 2001 he set the junior national record with a time of 53.89. On 14 May 2006 he made a time of 49.51 in the 400 m hurdles, the senior national record in this event. He also set an indoor 800 metres national record with a time of 1:49.59 (on an oversized track).

Competition record

References

External links

1983 births
Living people
Grenadian male sprinters
Grenadian male hurdlers
Pan American Games competitors for Grenada
Athletes (track and field) at the 2003 Pan American Games